County Antrim was a constituency represented in the Irish House of Commons until 1800.

Following the Acts of Union 1800 the constituency became Antrim (UK Parliament constituency).

History
The county constituency was enfranchised as a parliamentary constituency at an uncertain date, between the first known meeting of the Parliament in 1264 and the division of the area into baronies in 1584. It sent two knights of the shire to the Irish House of Commons.

The county was represented in the Parliament of the Commonwealth of England, Scotland and Ireland, under the Instrument of Government, after it was established in 1654 as part of the constituency of Down, Antrim and Armagh (constituency). Following the restoration of the monarchy in 1660 the Parliament of Ireland was re-established and the constituency again returned two Members of Parliament. In the Patriot Parliament of 1689 summoned by King James II, Antrim County was represented with two members.

Boundaries and Boundary Changes
1264-1800: A Topographical Dictionary of Ireland by Samuel Lewis discusses the administrative history of Antrim. It is uncertain when Antrim was made a County and given representation as such in Parliament. Something like the modern arrangements seems to have originated in 1584 when the Lord Deputy Sir John Perrot divided the area into baronies. From whatever point the county constituency existed it comprised the whole of County Antrim, excluding the parts in the borough constituencies of Antrim Borough (from 1666), Belfast (1613), Carrickfergus (1326), Lisburn (1661) and Randalstown (1683).

Members of Parliament

Notes

Elections

References

Bibliography

Constituencies of the Parliament of Ireland (pre-1801)
Historic constituencies in County Antrim
1800 disestablishments in Ireland
Constituencies disestablished in 1800